The following is a list of Intel Core i3 brand microprocessors. These processors are designed with cheap price points, while still retaining the power of the Intel Core line. As such they (along with Intel's i5 series) are often found in laptops and low-end desktop computers.

Desktop processors

Westmere microarchitecture (1st generation)

"Clarkdale" (MCP, 32 nm) 

 All models support: MMX, SSE, SSE2, SSE3, SSSE3, SSE4.1, SSE4.2, Enhanced Intel SpeedStep Technology (EIST), Intel 64, XD bit (an NX bit implementation), Intel VT-x, Hyper-Threading, Smart Cache.
 FSB has been replaced with DMI.
 Contains a GPU on a secondary die manufactured in 45 nm codenamed "Ironlake".
 Graphics and Integrated Memory Controller transistors: 177 million
 Graphics and Integrated Memory Controller die size: 114 mm²
 Transistors:947 million
 Die size: 81 mm²
 Stepping: C2, K0

Sandy Bridge microarchitecture (2nd generation)

"Sandy Bridge" (32 nm) 

 All models support: MMX, SSE, SSE2, SSE3, SSSE3, SSE4.1, SSE4.2, AVX, Enhanced Intel SpeedStep Technology (EIST), Intel 64, XD bit (an NX bit implementation), Intel VT-x, Hyper-threading, Smart Cache, Intel Insider.
 Stepping: Q0, J1
 Transistors: 624 million (J1), 504 million (Q0)
 Die size: 149 mm² (J1), 131 mm² (Q0)
 The Core i3-2102, once upgraded via Intel Upgrade Service,  operates at 3.6 GHz, has 3 MB L3 cache and is recognized as Core i3-2153.

Ivy Bridge microarchitecture (3rd generation)

"Ivy Bridge" (22 nm) 

 All models support: MMX, SSE, SSE2, SSE3, SSSE3, SSE4.1, SSE4.2, AVX, Enhanced Intel SpeedStep Technology (EIST), Intel 64, XD bit (an NX bit implementation), Intel VT-x, Hyper-threading, Smart Cache, Intel Insider.

Haswell microarchitecture (4th generation)

"Haswell-DT" (22 nm) 

 All models support: MMX, SSE, SSE2, SSE3, SSSE3, SSE4.1, SSE4.2, AVX, AVX2, FMA3, Enhanced Intel SpeedStep Technology (EIST), Intel 64, XD bit (an NX bit implementation), Intel VT-x, Hyper-threading, AES-NI, ECC memory, Smart Cache.
 Transistors: 1.4 billion
 Die size: 177mm²

Skylake microarchitecture (6th generation)

"Skylake-S" (14 nm) 

 All models support: MMX, SSE, SSE2, SSE3, SSSE3, SSE4.1, SSE4.2, AVX, AVX2, FMA3, Enhanced Intel SpeedStep Technology (EIST), Intel 64, XD bit (an NX bit implementation), Intel VT-x, Intel VT-d, Hyper-threading, AES-NI, ECC memory, Smart Cache.

Kaby Lake microarchitecture (7th generation)

"Kaby Lake-S" (14 nm) 

 All models support: MMX, SSE, SSE2, SSE3, SSSE3, SSE4.1, SSE4.2, AVX, AVX2, FMA3, Enhanced Intel SpeedStep Technology (EIST), Intel 64, XD bit (an NX bit implementation), Intel VT-x, Intel VT-d, Intel SGX, Intel MPX, Hyper-threading, AES-NI, Intel TSX-NI, Smart Cache.
 Low power models also support configurable TDP (cTDP) down.
 Embedded models also support ECC memory, but do not support Intel TSX-NI.
Overclocking: Unlocked multiplier on K models.

Coffee Lake microarchitecture (8th/9th generation)

"Coffee Lake-S" (14 nm) (9th gen is Coffee Lake-R) 

 All models support: MMX, SSE, SSE2, SSE3, SSSE3, SSE4.1, SSE4.2, AVX, AVX2, FMA3, Enhanced Intel SpeedStep Technology (EIST), Intel 64, XD bit (an NX bit implementation), Intel VT-x, Intel VT-d, Intel SGX, Intel MPX, AES-NI, Smart Cache.
 Embedded models also support ECC memory.
 Overclocking: Unlocked multiplier on K and KF models.
 9th generation models also support Turbo Boost.

"Coffee Lake-H" (14 nm)

Comet Lake microarchitecture (10th generation)

"Comet Lake-S" (14 nm) 

 All models support: MMX, SSE, SSE2, SSE3, SSSE3, SSE4.1, SSE4.2, AVX, AVX2, FMA3, Enhanced Intel SpeedStep Technology (EIST), Intel 64, XD bit (an NX bit implementation), Intel VT-x, Intel VT-d, Turbo Boost, Hyper-threading, Intel SGX, AES-NI, Smart Cache.
 All models support up to DDR4-2666 memory.
 Low power models also support configurable TDP (cTDP) down.
 Embedded models also support ECC memory.

Golden Cove microarchitecture (12th generation)

"Alder Lake" (Intel 7)
All models support: SSE4.1, SSE4.2, AVX, AVX2, FMA3, Enhanced Intel SpeedStep Technology (EIST), Intel 64, XD bit (an NX bit implementation), Intel VT-x, Intel VT-d, Hyper-threading, Turbo Boost, AES-NI, Smart Cache, DL Boost, GNA 3.0, and Optane memory.
All models support up to DDR5-4800 or DDR4-3200 memory, and 16 lanes of PCI Express 5.0 + 4 lanes of PCIe 4.0.

Raptor Cove microarchitecture (13th generation)

"Raptor Lake" (Intel 7)
All models support: SSE4.1, SSE4.2, AVX, AVX2, FMA3, Enhanced Intel SpeedStep Technology (EIST), Intel 64, XD bit (an NX bit implementation), Intel VT-x, Intel VT-d, Hyper-threading, Turbo Boost, AES-NI, Smart Cache, DL Boost, GNA 3.0.
All models support up to DDR5-4800 or DDR4-3200 memory, and 16 lanes of PCI Express 5.0 + 4 lanes of PCIe 4.0.

Mobile processors

Westmere microarchitecture (1st generation)

"Arrandale" (MCP, 32 nm) 

 All models support: MMX, SSE, SSE2, SSE3, SSSE3, SSE4.1, SSE4.2, Enhanced Intel SpeedStep Technology (EIST), Intel 64, XD bit (an NX bit implementation), Intel VT-x, Hyper-Threading, Smart Cache.
 Core i3-330E has support for ECC memory and PCI express port bifurcation.
 FSB has been replaced with DMI.
 Contains 45 nm "Ironlake" GPU.
 Transistors: 382 million
 Die size: 81 mm²
 Integrated Intel HD Graphics (Ironlake)
 Graphics and Integrated Memory Controller transistors: 177 million
 Graphics and Integrated Memory Controller die size: 114 mm²
 Stepping: C2, K0

Sandy Bridge microarchitecture (2nd generation)

"Sandy Bridge" (32 nm) 

 All models support: MMX, SSE, SSE2, SSE3, SSSE3, SSE4.1, SSE4.2, AVX, Enhanced Intel SpeedStep Technology (EIST), Intel 64, XD bit (an NX bit implementation), Intel VT-x, Hyper-threading, Smart Cache, Intel Insider.
 Core i3-2310E, Core i3-2340UE have support for ECC memory.
 Core i3-2310E, Core i3-2330E and Core i3-2340UE do not have support for Intel Insider
 Transistors: 624 million
 Die size: 149 mm²
 The Core i3-2312M, once upgraded via Intel Upgrade Service, operates at 2.5 GHz, has 4 MB L3 cache and is recognized as Core i3-2393M.
 The Core i3-2332M, once upgraded via Intel Upgrade Service, operates at 2.6 GHz, has 4 MB L3 cache and is recognized as Core i3-2394M.

Ivy Bridge microarchitecture (3rd generation)

"Ivy Bridge" (22 nm) 

 All models support: MMX, SSE, SSE2, SSE3, SSSE3, SSE4.1, SSE4.2, AVX, Enhanced Intel SpeedStep Technology (EIST), Intel 64, XD bit (an NX bit implementation), Intel VT-x, Hyper-threading, Smart Cache, Intel Insider.
 Core i3-3120ME, i3-3217UE have support for ECC memory.
 Core i3-3120ME, i3-3217UE do not have support for Intel Insider.
 Core i3-3229Y supports AES-NI.
 Die size: 94 mm²

Haswell microarchitecture (4th generation)

"Haswell-MB" (22 nm) 
 All models support: MMX, SSE, SSE2, SSE3, SSSE3, SSE4.1, SSE4.2, AVX, AVX2, FMA3, Enhanced Intel SpeedStep Technology (EIST), Intel 64, XD bit (an NX bit implementation), Intel VT-x, Hyper-threading, Smart Cache.

"Haswell-ULT" (SiP, 22 nm) 

 All models support: MMX, SSE, SSE2, SSE3, SSSE3, SSE4.1, SSE4.2, AVX, AVX2, FMA3, Enhanced Intel SpeedStep Technology (EIST), Intel 64, XD bit (an NX bit implementation), Intel VT-x, Hyper-threading, AES-NI, Smart Cache.
 Core i3-4010U and higher also support Intel VT-d
 Transistors: 1.3 billion
 Die size: 181 mm²

"Haswell-ULX" (SiP, 22 nm) 

 All models support: MMX, SSE, SSE2, SSE3, SSSE3, SSE4.1, SSE4.2, AVX, AVX2, FMA3, Enhanced Intel SpeedStep Technology (EIST), Intel 64, XD bit (an NX bit implementation), Intel VT-x, Hyper-threading, AES-NI, Smart Cache.
 Transistors: 1.3 billion
 Die size: 181 mm²

"Haswell-H" (22 nm) 

 All models support: MMX, SSE, SSE2, SSE3, SSSE3, SSE4.1, SSE4.2, AVX, AVX2, FMA3, Enhanced Intel SpeedStep Technology (EIST), Intel 64, XD bit (an NX bit implementation), Intel VT-x, Hyper-threading, Smart Cache.
 Transistors: 1.3 billion
 Die size: 181 mm²
 Embedded models support ECC memory

Broadwell microarchitecture (5th generation)

"Broadwell-U" (14 nm) 
 All models support: MMX, SSE, SSE2, SSE3, SSSE3, SSE4.1, SSE4.2, AVX, AVX2, FMA3, Enhanced Intel SpeedStep Technology (EIST), Intel 64, XD bit (an NX bit implementation), Intel VT-x, Intel VT-d, Hyper-threading, AES-NI, Smart Cache, and configurable TDP (cTDP) down

Skylake microarchitecture (6th generation)

"Skylake-H" (14 nm) 
 All models support: MMX, SSE, SSE2, SSE3, SSSE3, SSE4.1, SSE4.2, AVX, AVX2, FMA3, Enhanced Intel SpeedStep Technology (EIST), Intel 64, XD bit (an NX bit implementation), Intel VT-x, Intel VT-d, Hyper-threading, AES-NI, Smart Cache.
 Transistors: TBD
 Die size: TBD
 Embedded models support ECC memory

"Skylake-U" (14 nm) 
 All models support: MMX, SSE, SSE2, SSE3, SSSE3, SSE4.1, SSE4.2, AVX, AVX2, FMA3, Enhanced Intel SpeedStep Technology (EIST), Intel 64, XD bit (an NX bit implementation), Intel VT-x, Intel VT-d, Hyper-threading, AES-NI, Smart Cache, and configurable TDP (cTDP) down (except 6006U)

Kaby Lake microarchitecture (7th/8th generation)

"Kaby Lake-H" (14 nm) 
 All models support: MMX, SSE, SSE2, SSE3, SSSE3, SSE4.1, SSE4.2, AVX, AVX2, FMA3, SGX, MPX, Enhanced Intel SpeedStep Technology (EIST), Intel 64, XD bit (an NX bit implementation), Intel VT-x, Intel VT-d, Hyper-threading, AES-NI, Smart Cache.
 Transistors: TBD
 Die size: TBD
 Embedded models support ECC memory

"Kaby Lake-U" (14 nm) 
 All models support: MMX, SSE, SSE2, SSE3, SSSE3, SSE4.1, SSE4.2, AVX, AVX2, FMA3, SGX, MPX, Enhanced Intel SpeedStep Technology (EIST), Intel 64, XD bit (an NX bit implementation), Intel VT-x, Intel VT-d, Hyper-threading, AES-NI, Smart Cache, and configurable TDP (cTDP) down (except 7020U).

"Kaby Lake Refresh" (14 nm) 
 All models support: MMX, SSE, SSE2, SSE3, SSSE3, SSE4.1, SSE4.2, AVX, AVX2, FMA3, SGX, MPX, Enhanced Intel SpeedStep Technology (EIST), Intel 64, XD bit (an NX bit implementation), Intel VT-x, Intel VT-d, Turbo Boost, Hyper-threading, AES-NI, Smart Cache, and configurable TDP (cTDP) down.

"Amber Lake-Y" (dual-core, 14 nm) 
 All models support: MMX, SSE, SSE2, SSE3, SSSE3, SSE4.1, SSE4.2, AVX, AVX2, FMA3, MPX, Enhanced Intel SpeedStep Technology (EIST), Intel 64, XD bit (an NX bit implementation), Intel VT-x, Intel VT-d, Turbo Boost, Hyper-threading, AES-NI, Smart Cache, and configurable TDP (cTDP) up and down.

Coffee Lake microarchitecture (8th generation)

"Coffee Lake-B" (quad-core, 14 nm)

"Coffee Lake-H" (quad-core, 14 nm)

"Coffee Lake-U" (dual-core, 14 nm)

"Whiskey Lake-U" (dual-core, 14 nm)

"Amber Lake-Y" (dual-core, 14 nm)

Cannon Lake microarchitecture (8th generation)

"Cannon Lake-U" (dual-core, 10 nm)

Comet Lake microarchitecture (10th generation)

"Comet Lake-U" (dual-core, 14 nm)

Sunny Cove microarchitecture (10th generation)

"Ice Lake-U" (dual-core, 10 nm) 
 All models support: MMX, SSE, SSE2, SSE3, SSSE3, SSE4.1, SSE4.2, AVX, AVX2, AVX-512, FMA3, SGX, Speed Shift Technology (SST), Intel 64, XD bit (an NX bit implementation), Intel VT-x, Intel VT-d, Turbo Boost, Hyper-threading, AES-NI, Smart Cache, DL Boost, and configurable TDP (cTDP).

"Ice Lake-Y" (dual-core, 10 nm) 
 All models support: MMX, SSE, SSE2, SSE3, SSSE3, SSE4.1, SSE4.2, AVX, AVX2, AVX-512, FMA3, SGX, Speed Shift Technology (SST), Intel 64, XD bit (an NX bit implementation), Intel VT-x, Intel VT-d, Turbo Boost, Hyper-threading, AES-NI, Smart Cache, DL Boost, and configurable TDP (cTDP) (except 1000NG4).

Willow Cove microarchitecture (11th generation)

"Tiger Lake-H" (10 nm SuperFin) 
 All models support: SSE4.1, SSE4.2, AVX2, AVX-512, FMA3, Speed Shift Technology (SST), Intel 64, Intel VT-x, Intel VT-d, Turbo Boost, Hyper-threading, AES-NI, Smart Cache, DL Boost, Optane memory, GNA 2.0, IPU6, TB4, and configurable TDP (cTDP).

"Tiger Lake-UP3" (10 nm SuperFin) 
 All models support: SSE4.1, SSE4.2, AVX2, AVX-512, FMA3, Speed Shift Technology (SST), Intel 64, Intel VT-x, Intel VT-d, Turbo Boost, Hyper-threading, AES-NI, Smart Cache, DL Boost, Optane memory, GNA 2.0, IPU6 (except SRK08), TB4, and configurable TDP (cTDP).
 -RE models support ECC memory.

"Tiger Lake-UP4" (10 nm SuperFin) 
 All models support: SSE4.1, SSE4.2, AVX2, AVX-512, FMA3, Speed Shift Technology (SST), Intel 64, Intel VT-x, Intel VT-d, Turbo Boost, Hyper-threading, AES-NI, Smart Cache, DL Boost, Optane memory, GNA 2.0, IPU6, TB4, and configurable TDP (cTDP).

Golden Cove + Gracemont microarchitecture (12th generation)

"Alder Lake-H" (Intel 7) 
 All models support: SSE4.1, SSE4.2, AVX, AVX2, FMA3, Speed Shift Technology (SST), Intel 64, XD bit (an NX bit implementation), Intel VT-x, Intel VT-d, Hyper-threading, Turbo Boost, AES-NI, Smart Cache, Thread Director, DL Boost, and GNA 3.0.
 All models support up to DDR5-4800, LPDDR5-5200, DDR4-3200, or LPDDR4X-4266 memory, and 28 lanes of PCI Express 5.0/4.0.
 Embedded models also support configurable TDP (cTDP) down.

"Alder Lake-P" (Intel 7) 
 All models support: SSE4.1, SSE4.2, AVX, AVX2, FMA3, Speed Shift Technology (SST), Intel 64, Intel VT-x, Intel VT-d, Hyper-threading, Turbo Boost, AES-NI, IPU6, TB4, Smart Cache, Thread Director, DL Boost, and GNA 3.0.
 All models support up to DDR5-4800, LPDDR5-5200, DDR4-3200, or LPDDR4X-4266 memory, and 20 lanes of PCI Express 4.0/3.0.

"Alder Lake-U" (Intel 7) 
 All models support: SSE4.1, SSE4.2, AVX, AVX2, FMA3, Speed Shift Technology (SST), Intel 64, Intel VT-x, Intel VT-d, Hyper-threading, Turbo Boost, AES-NI, IPU6 (except SRLFU), TB4, Smart Cache, Thread Director, DL Boost, and GNA 3.0.
 Support 20 lanes (UP3) or 14 lanes (UP4) of PCI Express 4.0/3.0.
 All models support up to LPDDR5-5200 or LPDDR4X-4266 memory.
 Standard power models also support up to DDR5-4800 or DDR4-3200 memory.

"Alder Lake-N" (Intel 7) 

All models support: SSE4.1, SSE4.2, AVX, AVX2, FMA3, Speed Shift Technology (SST), Intel 64, Intel VT-x, Intel VT-d, Turbo Boost, AES-NI, IPU6, and GNA 3.0.
 All models support up to DDR5-4800, LPDDR5-4800, or DDR4-3200, and 9 lanes of PCI Express 3.0.

Raptor Cove + Gracemont microarchitecture (13th generation)

"Raptor Lake-H" (Intel 7) 
 All models support: SSE4.1, SSE4.2, AVX, AVX2, FMA3, Speed Shift Technology (SST), Intel 64, XD bit (an NX bit implementation), Intel VT-x, Intel VT-d, Hyper-threading, Turbo Boost, AES-NI, Smart Cache, Thread Director, DL Boost, and GNA 3.0.
 All models support up to DDR5-5200, LPDDR5-6400, DDR4-3200, or LPDDR4X-4266 memory, and 28 lanes of PCI Express 5.0/4.0.

"Raptor Lake-P" (Intel 7) 
 All models support: SSE4.1, SSE4.2, AVX, AVX2, FMA3, Speed Shift Technology (SST), Intel 64, Intel VT-x, Intel VT-d, Hyper-threading, Turbo Boost, AES-NI, IPU6, TB4, Smart Cache, Thread Director, DL Boost, and GNA 3.0.
 All models support up to DDR5-5200, LPDDR5-5200, DDR4-3200, or LPDDR4X-4266 memory, and 20 lanes of PCI Express 4.0/3.0.

"Raptor Lake-U" (Intel 7) 
 All models support: SSE4.1, SSE4.2, AVX, AVX2, FMA3, Speed Shift Technology (SST), Intel 64, Intel VT-x, Intel VT-d, Hyper-threading, Turbo Boost, AES-NI, IPU6 (except SRLFU), TB4, Smart Cache, Thread Director, DL Boost, and GNA 3.0.
 Intel Thermal Velocity Boost is not supported on Raptor Lake-U mobile processors.
 Support 20 lanes (UP3) of PCI Express 4.0/3.0.
 1315U and 1305U support up to LPDDR5-5200 memory, while 1315UE support up to LPDDR5-5200 memory.
 All models support up to LPDDR4X-4266 memory.
 Standard power models also support up to DDR5-5200 or DDR4-3200 memory.

Embedded processors

Sandy Bridge microarchitecture (2nd generation)

"Gladden" (32 nm) 

 All models support: MMX, SSE, SSE2, SSE3, SSSE3, SSE4.1, SSE4.2, AVX, Enhanced Intel SpeedStep Technology (EIST), Intel 64, XD bit (an NX bit implementation), Intel VT-x, EPT, Hyper-threading, Smart Cache, ECC memory.
 Transistors:
 Die size:

Ivy Bridge microarchitecture (3rd generation)

"Gladden" (22 nm) 

 All models support: MMX, SSE, SSE2, SSE3, SSSE3, SSE4.1, SSE4.2, AVX, Enhanced Intel SpeedStep Technology (EIST), Intel 64, XD bit (an NX bit implementation), Intel VT-x, EPT, Hyper-threading, Smart Cache, ECC memory.
 Transistors:
 Die size:

See also 
 Intel Core
 List of Intel Celeron microprocessors
 List of Intel Pentium microprocessors
 List of Intel Core i5 microprocessors
 List of Intel Core i7 microprocessors
 List of Intel Core i9 microprocessors

References

External links 
 Intel Core i3 desktop processor product order code table
 Intel Core i3 mobile processor product order code table
 Search MDDS Database
 Intel ARK Database
 Intel CPU Transition Roadmap 2008-2013
 Intel Desktop CPU Roadmap 2004-2011

Core i3
Intel Core i3